Epeiromulona biloba is a moth of the subfamily Arctiinae. It was described by William D. Field in 1952. It is found in Panama and Colombia.

The forewings are white with 15 small black spots and bars. The hindwings, including fringe are pale orange yellow with an apical black spot on the costal margin at the apex.

References

 

Lithosiini
Moths described in 1952